Bachelor Father is an American sitcom starring John Forsythe, Noreen Corcoran and Sammee Tong. The series first premiered on CBS in September 1957 before moving to NBC for the third season in 1959. The series' fifth and final season aired on ABC. A total of 157 episodes were aired. The series was based on "A New Girl in His Life", which aired on General Electric Theater on May 26, 1957.

Bachelor Father is the only primetime series ever to run in consecutive years on the three major television networks (ABC, CBS and NBC).

Overview
Bachelor Father follows the adventures of Bentley Gregg, a wealthy bachelor attorney living in Beverly Hills who assumes the responsibility of raising his niece, Kelly (Noreen Corcoran), after her parents die in an automobile accident. Other members of the cast included houseboy Peter Tong (Sammee Tong), teenage neighbor and Kelly's on and off boyfriend, Howard Meechum (Jimmy Boyd), Kelly's best friend, Ginger Farrell (Bernadette Withers) and Jasper, the dog. Withers appeared in 51 episodes from 1957 to 1962; Boyd in 37 from 1958 to 1962. Plots center on Bentley's adjustments to his new role as an adoptive parent, his search for the right woman to share his life, Kelly facing the usual problems of adolescence and young adulthood, Kelly's ritual of passage from high school to college, and Peter's misadventures with his family, love life and financial schemes.

Asian rights activist Guy Aoki has praised the show for prominently featuring Asian actors and storylines, including "feisty" comedian Sammee Tong and Victor Sen Yung, the scheming "Uncle Charlie", "a slick, Americanized character. I thought it was great that way back in the ’50s, audiences saw a Chinese American who acted just like anyone else."

The program's final season storylines led to Kelly's impending marriage to Bentley's junior partner Warren Dawson (Aron Kincaid). The two met, became engaged, interacted with other couples and even met Dawson's parents (who flew in from New York on short notice), all in a span of three episodes. Without mention or explanation, Kincaid's character was dropped after four episodes and by the series finale, Kelly is seeing a different man with no marriage plans. Meechum (Boyd) appears in several Season 5 episodes, but he is never developed as a serious romantic interest for Kelly. As the series was canceled after 157 episodes, Bachelor Father did not have a formal series finale.

Primary cast
According to John Forsythe, the Bentley Gregg character was based on two well-known Beverly Hills bachelors at the time. He combined their names and used it for the characters in the program. Because of the implication in the program of Gregg's aversion to marriage, no serious thoughts were given to casting a 'regular' or steady woman for him. Instead, Gregg is forever dating different women with only a handful ever getting a 'second' date with him.

Forsythe noted that casting the main characters took considerable effort. Then actor (and future California governor and United States president) Ronald Reagan, who hosted General Electric Theater from 1954 to 1962, suggested Corcoran for the role, believing her to be a 'typical teenager' and closer to what a normal 13-year-old was like, and Forsythe agreed. Corcoran was already an experienced actress with film and television roles to her credit. She was 18 years old when the program left the air and had virtually 'grown up' into a young woman during the show's five-year run.

Casting Bentley Gregg's houseboy was difficult as well. Sammee Tong was cast based primarily on his experience as a stand-up comedian. Forsythe believed much of the program's success resulted from the interaction between Tong and himself and that Tong had great comic timing. He also stated that Tong's character was unique for the time and that he was not the "typical" Asian house servant. Forsythe insisted on Tong being a major character on the program. Several of the program plots center around Tong, many dealing with his attempts to improve his position in life. Although none ever pan out (much like Bentley or Kelly) he does develop as a character through the life of the program.

Kelly's (Noreen Corcoran) best friend was Ginger, played by Bernadette Withers.

Guest stars
Among the series guest stars were Edgar Bergen, Bill Bixby, Billy Gray, Ryan O'Neal, Frankie Laine, Mary Tyler Moore and singer Patti Page. Eddie Anderson, who portrayed "Rochester" on The Jack Benny Program, reprised his role in the Season 5 episode, "Pinch That Penny". Besides the 'Benny' link, the series had connections to The George Burns and Gracie Allen Show as Harry Von Zell appeared in five season three episodes as Bentley Gregg's friend and next-door neighbor. The Burns' son, Ronnie Burns, appeared on two episodes, as well. Fifteen-year-old Linda Evans also appeared in a guest spot on the series as one of Kelly's friends. Evans and Forsythe later starred in the primetime soap opera Dynasty together.

Other guest stars include:

 Jack Albertson
 Eddie "Rochester" Anderson
 Frank Bank
 Jack Benny
 June Blair
 Whitney Blake
 Jean Carson
 Donna Douglas
 Barbara Eden
 Cheryl Holdridge
 Arlene Howell
 Charles Lane
 Sue Ane Langdon
 Cherylene Lee
 Jenny Maxwell
 Gisele MacKenzie
 Ann McCrea
 Howard McNear
 Joyce Meadows
 Joanna Moore
 Dean Reed
 Evelyn Scott
 Vito Scotti
 Olan Soule

Broadcast history
The series' pilot episode, "A New Girl in His Life", originally aired on General Electric Theater on May 26, 1957. The series was first telecast on CBS on September 15, 1957. It originally aired on Sunday evenings on alternating weeks with The Jack Benny Program (Benny guest starred on one episode) opposite NBC's Sally and ABC's Maverick with James Garner. The show moved to NBC as a weekly series on Thursday nights in June 1959 (the Summer 1959 run on NBC were reruns of previous CBS episodes) and concluded its run on that network in September 1961. The series then moved on to ABC on Tuesday nights in 1961 for its final season. The last "first run" episode (the 157th unique episode) aired on June 26, 1962, with reruns filling the remainder of the summer.

Bachelor Father is the only series to ever run in consecutive seasons on all three major TV networks of the time (ABC, CBS and NBC). On November 22, 1963, a re-run episode of Bachelor Father was airing on several NBC affiliates in the Eastern Time Zone, Don Pardo broke in at 1:45 PM EST with the first bulletin of the shooting of President John F. Kennedy in Dallas.

Episodes

Season 1 (1957–58)

Season 2 (1958–59)

* Because of the Hollywood Blacklist, Alfred Lewis Levitt was credited as "Tom August".

Season 3 (1959–60)

Season 4 (1960–61)

Season 5 (1961–62)

Production notes
Bachelor Father was filmed at Revue Studios. It was primarily sponsored by American Tobacco (Tareyton cigarettes) and American Home Products Corporation (Anacin, Dristan and Chef Boyardee)  throughout its original run. The series was produced by Forsythe's "Bachelor Productions" in association with MCA's Revue Studios. Bachelor Father pilot and broadcast season were produced by Harry Ackerman, who left Revue/MCA after the first season to produce other sitcoms like Hazel, Bewitched and I Dream of Jeannie for Screen Gems/Columbia. He was later replaced by Everett Freeman for the rest of the show's run.

Syndication
Reruns of Bachelor Father were syndicated on the Retro Television Network until October 2011. The show then began airing on Antenna TV, but remained off schedule from January 2015 to January 2022.

References

External links

1957 American television series debuts
1962 American television series endings
1950s American sitcoms
1960s American sitcoms
American Broadcasting Company original programming
Black-and-white American television shows
CBS original programming
English-language television shows
NBC original programming
Television series by Universal Television
Television shows set in Los Angeles
Television shows set in Beverly Hills, California
Television series about lawyers
Fiction about fatherhood
Television series about adoption